Natsvlishvili is a Georgian surname. Notable people with the surname include:

 Tako Natsvlishvili (born 1998), Georgian model
 Nicolay Natzvalov (Natsvlishvili), Russian general of Georgian origin

Georgian-language surnames
Surnames of Georgian origin